Returns is a live album by the fusion band Return to Forever. Released in 2009 by Eagle Records, it is the first recording by the band after a hiatus of 32 years. Also in 2009 a video recording of the band's live performances from the "Returns" tour at Montreux, Switzerland and (bonus material) Clearwater, Florida was released by Eagle Rock Entertainment as Returns: Live at Montreux 2008.

CD track listing

Disc one 
"Opening Prayer" (Chick Corea) – 2:03
"Hymn of the Seventh Galaxy" (Corea) – 3:43
"Vulcan Worlds" (Stanley Clarke) – 13:45
"Sorceress" (Lenny White) – 11:22
"Song to the Pharaoh Kings" (Corea) – 27:13
Al's Solo, including – 8:54
"Children's Song #3" (Corea) duet with Chick Corea
"Passion Grace & Fire" (di Meola)
"Mediterranean Sundance" (di Meola)
"Café 1930"(Astor Piazzolla)
"Spain"(Corea, Joaquín Rodrigo) duet with Chick Corea
"No Mystery" (Corea) – 8:52

Disc two 
"Friendship" (Corea) Chick's Solo, including "Solar" (Miles Davis) – 8:52
"Romantic Warrior" (Corea) – 7:19
"El Bayo de Negro" Stanley's Solo (Clarke) – 11:25
"Lineage" Lenny's Solo (White) – 7:39
"Romantic Warrior" (continued) (Corea) – 3:03
"Duel of the Jester and the Tyrant" (Corea) – 14:03
Bonus tracks
"500 Miles High" (Corea) – 12:48
BBC Lifetime Achievement Award to RTF as presented by Sir George Martin, including a performance of "Romantic Warrior" – 8:20

Recorded at the:
 Ruth Eckerd Hall, Clearwater, Florida, the U.S., July 31, 2008 (tracks 1.1–2.5)
 Bank of America Pavilion, Boston, Massachusetts, the U.S., August 6, 2008 (track 2.6)
 Stravinski Auditorium, Montreux Jazz Festival, Switzerland, July 18, 2008 (track 2.7)

DVD-Video track listing 
Main show – Stravinski Auditorium, Montreux Jazz Festival, Switzerland, 18 July 2008
Introduction 
"Hymn of the Seventh Galaxy" (Chick Corea)
"Vulcan Worlds" (Stanley Clarke)
"Sorceress" (Lenny White)
"Song to the Pharaoh Kings" (Corea)
Al's solo 
"No Mystery" (Corea)
"Chick's Solo 
"Romantic Warrior" (Corea)
"El Bayo de Negro" (Stanley's solo) 
"Lineage" (Lenny's solo) 
"Romantic Warrior" (conclusion) (Corea)
Bonus tracks – Ruth Eckerd Hall, Clearwater, Florida, 31 July 2008	
"Lineage" (Lenny's solo) 
Al's solo 
"Friendship" (Chick's solo) 
"El Bayo de Negro" (Stanley's solo) 
"Duel of the Jester and the Tyrant" (Corea)

Personnel 
Return to Forever
 Chick Corea – Yamaha grand piano C3MP, Rhodes Midi Piano Mark V, synthesizers (Minimoog Voyager, Sequential Circuits Prophet-5, Yamaha Motif)
 Al Di Meola – acoustic and electric guitar
 Stanley Clarke – electric and acoustic bass
 Lenny White – drums

CD production
 Return To Forever – producer
 Bernie Kirsh – engineer (recording, mixing)
 Buck Snow – engineer (mixing)
 Doug Sax – engineer (mastering)
 Marc Bessant – artwork, cover

DVD-Video production
 Return To Forever – producer, engineer (mixing)
 Christine Strand – producer (video), director
 Josh Adams – producer (video)
 Buck Snow – engineer (mixing)
 E. Churchod – photography
 Georges A. Braunschweig – photography

Chart performance

References 

 Review of video at Jazztimes.com by Meredith, Bill

External links 
 Return to Forever - Returns (2009) album review by Hal Horowitz, credits & releases at AllMusic
 Return to Forever - Returns (2009) album releases & credits at Discogs
 Return to Forever - Returns (2009) album to be listened as stream on Spotify
 Return to Forever - Returns: Live at Montreux 2008 (2009) Blu-ray/DVD releases & credits at Discogs

Return to Forever albums
2009 live albums
Live jazz fusion albums